Moisè Tedeschi (Hebrew form: Moshe Yitzhak Ashkenazi ) was an Italian rabbi and Bible commentator. He is primarily known for writing the commentary Hoil Moshe.

Biography
Tedeschi was born on June 6, 1821 and died June 17, 1898. He lived nearly all his life in Trieste, Italy. At age 10 his father died, and the family was reduced to "limited but quiet" circumstances. His teachers included Shemuel Chayyim Zalman and Samuel David Luzzatto.

As an adult, he worked as a teacher in the local Jewish schools and later for individuals. For a brief period in 1861,  he served as a rabbi of Spoleto. His autobiography, published in Simchat HaRegel, was written at age 63.

Works
Tedeschi is best known for Hoil Moshe, a commentary on all 24 books of Tanach.

He also wrote two books of Jewish thought: Mussar Melachim (a mussar work) and Simchat Haregel (a series of sermons on the holidays, along with ideas on the Targum of Mishlei, and his autobiography.)

References

 R. Moshe Yitzchak Ashkenazi (Hoil Moshe)
 Ho'il Moshe, Part I, R. Moses Isaac Tedeschi (Ashkenazi)
 Simchat HaRegel, by Tedeschi
 Catalog 207: rare and important titles in Jewish thought: Hebrew Bible, rabbinics, the haskalah, and beyond

1821 births
1898 deaths
19th-century Italian rabbis
19th-century Jewish biblical scholars
Italian Orthodox rabbis
Writers from Trieste
Italian schoolteachers